The 1990–91 Argentine Primera División was the 101st season of top-flight professional football in Argentina. Starting with this season, both Apertura and Clausura tournaments were recognised as separate championships, and no final decider was played between the winners of each tournament. River Plate won the Apertura and Newell's Old Boys won the Clausura. 

The season ran from 10 September 1991 to 5 July 1992, with Quilmes and Unión de Santa Fe being relegated.

Competition format
The tournament for the 1991–92 season was composed of 20 teams. Each team played each other in a single round-robin tournament. The season was divided in two separate championships, called Apertura (Opening) and Clausura (Closing). If each tournament was won by a different team, they played a two-legged qualifier for the 1993 Copa Libertadores. To decide the remaining berth for the Copa Libertadores, the four runners-up from the Apertura tournaments and the four runners-up from the Clausura tournament (not already qualified in the Apertura tournament) competed in an eight-team knockout round. The winning team played against the losing team from the two-legged qualifier and was granted a berth in the 1993 Copa Libertadores. The losing team plus the finalist and best semi-finalist of the eight-team knockout round competed in the 1992 Copa CONMEBOL. Relegation occurred at the end of the Clausura stage, with the two teams with the worst three-year point average (Primera División competition only) being relegated to Primera B Nacional competition.

Apertura Tournament

The Apertura Tournament began on 29 August 1991 and finished on 22 December 1991. River Plate won the tournament. The match between River Plate and Racing was suspended, with the victory being awarded later to River Plate.

Clausura Tournament

The Clausura Tournament began on 21 February 1992 and finished on 5 July 1992. Newell's Old Boys won their fourth title. Quilmes was deducted two points following incidents in their match against Ferro Carril Oeste.

Copa Libertadores qualification
Champions of the Apertura tournament River Plate faced Clausura champions Newell's Old Boys for a spot in the 1993 Copa Libertadores. The losing team would play against the winner of the eight-team knockout round for the remaining berth. River Plate won two of the three matches and qualified for the Copa Libertadores.

The second qualifying instance to the 1993 Copa Libertadores began on 10 July 1992 and finished on 26 July 1992. Eight teams competed in a direct elimination knockout tournament with home and away matches, where the winning team faced the losing team from the first qualifier. The losing team from this qualifier plus the two best teams from the knockout phase qualified for the 1992 Copa CONMEBOL.

2nd. place match 
Vélez Sarsfield played a final playoff match against Newell's Old Boys for the remaining berth in the 1993 Copa Libertadores.

Relegation
At the end of the season Quilmes and Unión were relegated after finishing with the two worst points averages.

See also
1991–92 in Argentine football

References

Argentine Primera División seasons
1
Argentine
Argentine